John Brian Naylor (24 March 1923 – 8 August 1989) was a British racing driver from England.  He was born in Salford and died in Marbella, Spain. He participated in 7 Formula One World Championship Grands Prix, debuting on 3 August 1958.  He scored no championship points.

Naylor financed the building of his own Cooper-based JBW car, which he raced in several grands prix, although the car was out of its depth at that level.

He finished 42nd in the 1961 Daytona 500 becoming the first European driver to compete in NASCAR.

Motorsports career results
(key)

Complete Formula One World Championship results

NASCAR Grand National Series

References

External links
 

English racing drivers
English Formula One drivers
JBW Formula One drivers
1923 births
1989 deaths
24 Hours of Le Mans drivers
NASCAR drivers
World Sportscar Championship drivers